Otto Maschl (1898–1973), better known as Lucien Laurat, was an Austrian Marxist and author, mostly known in the English-speaking world for his book Marxism and Democracy. He was part  of the Anti-Stalinist left.

In Marxism and Democracy Laurat provides an examination into the views of Rosa Luxemburg and her critique of Leninism. He examines the way she describes the changing roles of governing forces away from simply imposing their will to maintain power to a system of enlightening the masses and becoming a function of their collective or a majoritive portion of their collective wills. Laurat was one of the first to argue that Soviet society was neither capitalist nor socialist, but a bureaucratic oligarchy (see Nomenklatura).

Publications 
 Marxism and Democracy, London, 1940
 Staline: La linguistique et l'impérialisme Russe [Stalin: Linguistics and Russian Imperialism], Paris: Les  Îles d'Or, 1951

References

Austrian communists
Communist Party of Austria politicians
Marxist writers
1898 births
1973 deaths
Anti-Stalinist left
People from Vienna